Nokjo (Balochi) is town and union council of Awaran District in the Balochistan province of Pakistan. It is located at 28°23'20N 66°13'20E in Mashkai tehsil and has an altitude of 1706 metres (5600 feet).

References

Populated places in Awaran District
Union councils of Balochistan, Pakistan